The Deputy Commander Field Army is a senior British Army officer who serves as deputy to the Commander Field Army. It currently is held by an Army Reserve officer.

History
The UK Field Army was first established in 1982 when the Deputy Commander-in-Chief at UK Land Forces was designated Commander of that formation. In 1995 the designation changed to Deputy Commander-in-Chief, Land Command. The Field Army was re-established in 2003, under the LANDmark reorganisation. The Commander of the Field Army had two deployable Divisions (1st Armoured Division and 3rd Mechanised Division), HQ 6th Division, Theatre Troops, Joint Helicopter Command, and Training Support under him. The post of Commander Field Army ceased to exist from 1 November 2011 following a major army command reorganisation. The post of Deputy Commander Land Forces was recreated again in January 2012.

Recent Deputy Commanders
Recent Commanders have been:
Deputy Commander-in-Chief UK Land Forces
1972-1973 Lieutenant-General Sir Frank King
1973-1976 Lieutenant-General Sir Allan Taylor
1976-1977 Lieutenant-General Sir Hugh Beach
1977-1980 Lieutenant-General Sir Peter Hudson
1980-1982 Lieutenant-General Sir Frank Kitson

Commander UK Field Army
1982-1984 Lieutenant-General Sir Edward Burgess
1984-1987 Lieutenant-General Sir John Akehurst
1987-1990 Lieutenant-General Sir David Ramsbotham
1990-1993 Lieutenant-General Sir Michael Wilkes
1993-1994 Lieutenant-General Sir Michael Rose
1994-1995 Lieutenant-General Sir Richard Swinburn

Deputy Commander-in-Chief Land Command
1995-1997 Lieutenant-General Sir Hew Pike
1997-2001 Lieutenant-General Sir Jack Deverell

Recent Deputy Commanders (Reserves)

In 2011 a two-star appointment was created for the officer commanding the Territorial Army; this officer has inherited the above designation. This now has separated. Recent Commanders for the Territorial Army/Army Reserves have been:

Deputy Commander Land Forces (Reserves)
2011–2012 Major-General The Duke of Westminster

Deputy Commander Land Forces
2012–2015 Major-General Ranald Munro

Deputy Commander Field Army (Reserves)

References

Senior appointments of the British Army